Giovanni Lapentti tried to defend his 2008 title, but he was eliminated by Santiago Giraldo in the quarterfinals.
Carlos Salamanca became the new champion, after beating Sebastián Decoud 7–6(4), 6–7(5), 6–4 in the final.

Seeds

Draw

Final eight

Top half

Bottom half

References
 Main Draw
 Qualifying Draw

Club Premium Open - Singles
2009 Club Premium Open